The Human Octopus (Spanish: El pulpo humano) is a 1934 Mexican film. It stars Sara García.

External links
 

1934 films
Mexican black-and-white films
1930s Spanish-language films
Mexican drama films
1934 drama films
1930s Mexican films